Tihon Konstantinov (13 August 1898 – 20 January 1957) was a Moldavian SSR and Ukrainian SSR politician.

Biography
Konstantinov was born in the village Khoroshoe of Pavlograd uyezd, Yekaterinoslav Governorate. The village was located by the Samara river, while next to the village there was the estate Dobrenkoe.

In the 1938–1940, he was a chairman of the council in the Moldavian ASSR in Tiraspol and a people's deputy of the Verkhovna Rada of the Ukrainian SSR.

Tihon Konstantinov was the prime minister of Moldavian SSR (2 August 1940 – 17 April 1945) (in exile in Russian SFSR from June 1941 until August 1944). The exact name was Chairman of the Council of People's Commissars.

During his mandate as prime minister, Piotr Borodin and Nikita Salogor were first secretaries of the Communist Party of Moldova.

Awards
 Order of Lenin (February 7, 1939), for prominent successes in Agriculture and particularly for over-fulfillment of plans for major agricultural works.

References

Enciclopedia sovietică moldovenească (Chişinău, 1970–1977)

1898 births
1957 deaths
People from Luhansk Oblast
People from Yekaterinoslav Governorate
Communist Party of the Soviet Union members
First convocation members of the Supreme Soviet of the Soviet Union
First convocation members of the Verkhovna Rada of the Ukrainian Soviet Socialist Republic
Politicians of the Moldavian Autonomous Soviet Socialist Republic
Communist Party of Moldavia politicians
Heads of government of the Moldavian Soviet Socialist Republic
Recipients of the Order of Lenin
Recipients of the Order of the Red Banner